Helge Halkjær (20 December 1916 – 14 February 1996) was a Danish rower who competed in the 1948 Summer Olympics.

He was born in Thorning, Region Midtjylland and died in Kolding. In 1948 he was a crew member of the Danish boat which won the silver medal in the coxless four event.

References

1916 births
1996 deaths
Danish male rowers
Olympic rowers of Denmark
Rowers at the 1948 Summer Olympics
Olympic silver medalists for Denmark
Olympic medalists in rowing
Medalists at the 1948 Summer Olympics
Sportspeople from the Central Denmark Region